Hanthana Linux is a Linux distribution based on Fedora, distributed as free and open source software.

It is specially designed to cater to the needs of Sri Lankan computer users who are unable to access the Internet frequently, with many most-wanted applications built in.

Hanthana is developed by the Sri Lanka-based Hanthana Community.

History and development process

Hanthana is a remix of the Fedora operating system. The original aim of the Hanthana team was to create an easy-to-use Linux desktop with as many useful applications preloaded, as downloading applications over the Internet is not possible for many rural areas of Sri Lanka.

Hanthana's first release was on 19 September 2009. Since then, Hanthana community has released new versions of Hanthana every six months with commitment to support each release for eighteen months by providing security fixes, patches to critical bugs and minor updates to programs. Once a new Fedora version is released, after some time, the corresponding Hanthana
version will be released and it contains all the software updates up to the date of release.

Hanthana packages are based on packages from Fedora's: both distributions use RedHat's rpm package format and package management tools Yum (PackageKit).

Features

Hanthana is composed of many software packages, of which the majority are distributed under a free software license, making an exception only for some proprietary hardware drivers. The main license used is the GNU General Public License (GNU GPL) which, along with the GNU Lesser General Public License (GNU LGPL), explicitly declares that users are free to run, copy, distribute, study, change, develop and improve the software. On the other hand, there is also proprietary software available that can run on Hanthana. Hanthana focuses on usability, security and stability. Hanthana also emphasizes accessibility and internationalization to reach as many people as possible. From the start UTF-8 is the default character encoding, which allows for support of a variety of non-Roman scripts.

Hanthana comes installed with a wide range of software that includes LibreOffice, Firefox, Pidgin, Transmission, GIMP, and several lightweight games (such as Sudoku and chess).

Installation

Installation of Hanthana is generally performed with the Live DVD. Hanthana can be run directly from the DVD (albeit with a significant performance loss), allowing a user to "test-drive" the OS for hardware compatibility and driver support.

Users can download a disk image (.iso) of the DVD, which can then either be written to a physical medium (DVD), or optionally run directly from a hard drive (via UNetbootin or GRUB).

Following minimum hardware specifications will ensure your work on Hanthana easier and faster:

For text mode
recommended processor : 200 MHz Pentium Pro or faster
minimum memory (RAM): 256 MB
For graphical mode
recommended processor : 400 MHz Pentium Pro or faster
minimum memory (RAM): 640 MB
recommended memory (RAM): 1152 MB
Hard disk minimum free space of 15GB
A DVD ROM

Latest Version

Hanthana Developer team has announced the release of Hanthana Linux 30 (Vishwa) ), a Fedora-based distribution on a 1.9 GB live DVD with a large number of applications, media codecs and custom artwork: "Hanthana Linux 28 (Kandula - Security Edition of Hanthana Linux pre-released) is released.

Hanthana Linux 28 (Kandula - Security Edition of Hanthana Linux), the latest release of Hanthana part of the Hanthana Linux project. In addition to the host of applications, the new release has the official LibreOffice guide provided by The Document Foundation added as well.

Please note there are various desktop editions including Gnome 3,Gnome Sugar,KDE,LXDE,XFCE.

See also

Linux User Group
List of Linux distributions
List of Fedora-based operating systems
Computer technology for developing areas

References

External links

 Hanthana 19.0 Review: Sri Lankan spiced up Fedora, has some bugs but quite good in overall – A user review based on Hanthana Linux 19.
 Weekend Project: Linux Distros You Never Heard Of – Review on Linux[dot]com.
 Best Linux Distributions Based On Fedora – Review on itsfoss blog.
 Hanthana Linux on Channel Eye RiseNShine - TV Programme about Hanthana Linux on ChannelEye
 Open source opening doors to IT - Danishka Navin speaks to the Mirror about revolutionizing IT needs among those in the outstations with open source software
 Hanthana Community - Hanthana Linux Support Group

RPM-based Linux distributions
X86-64 Linux distributions
Linux distributions